Francis Williams may refer to:
Francis Williams (headmaster) (1830–1895) Anglican priest and headmaster in South Australia
Francis Williams (musician) (1910–1983), American jazz trumpeter
Francis Williams (poet) (1702–1770), scholar and poet born in Kingston, Jamaica
Francis Xavier Williams (1882–1967), American entomologist
Francis Cromwell alias Williams, MP for Huntingdonshire
Francis Williams, Baron Francis-Williams (1903–1970), British newspaper editor and public relations advisor to British prime minister Clement Attlee

See also
Frances Williams
Frank Williams (disambiguation)